Bahnemir Rural District is a rural district (dehestan) in Bahnemir District, Babolsar County, Mazandaran Province, Iran. At the 2006 census, its population was 11,394, in 2,923 families. The rural district has 17 villages.

References 

Rural Districts of Mazandaran Province
Babolsar County